Eamon McGee (born 26 April 1984) is an Irish Gaelic footballer who plays for Gaoth Dobhair and also, formerly, for the Donegal county team (between 2004 and 2016). He is the older brother of Neil McGee.

From Gweedore in County Donegal, he won one All-Ireland Senior Football Championship, three Ulster Senior Football Championships and one National Football League with his county and an Ulster title with his club. For a small time until Patrick McBrearty, Neil McGee, Paddy McGrath, Leo McLoone, Frank McGlynn, Michael Murphy and Anthony Thompson surpassed it in 2018, McGee's haul of Ulster Senior Football Championships was a joint county team record (alongside such past players as Anthony Molloy, Martin McHugh, Joyce McMullan and Donal Reid).

Playing career

Club
The final of the 2002 Donegal Senior Football Championship, featuring McGee and his club, was not played until 2003 due to a disagreement between two other clubs over Eddie Brennan. McGee has described the medal he received as "tainted".

In 2006, his club were back in the final of the Donegal Senior Football Championship. He played as his team won their 14th County Championship in one of the worst Donegal county finals ever.

He was sent off in the final of the 2018 Ulster Senior Club Football Championship.

Inter-county
McGee was first called up to the senior team by Brian McEniff for winter training in 2003. His early years in a Donegal shirt were marked by lapses of discipline—at one point Shane Carr left the panel when McGee moved ahead of him on the substitutes bench despite his lack of dedication.

During the 2004 All-Ireland Senior Football Championship, he and Brian McLaughlin were suspended from the Donegal panel for a breach of discipline. The BBC reported that the pair had arrived for a "training session in an unfit condition" on two consecutive nights, one month after failing to turn up for one session at all.

In 2006, he and Kevin Cassidy were suspended from the Donegal football panel over a breach of discipline. McGee later returned and played in the 2006 Ulster Senior Football Championship Final at Croke Park, scoring one point.

McGee was a member of the Donegal team that won the National Football League in 2007, playing from the start to the end in the final against Mayo.

He spent some time in London and trained with their county team before returning to Donegal in 2010.

He and his brother played in the 2012 All-Ireland Senior Football Championship Final against Mayo. He had missed the start of the 2012 Ulster Senior Football Championship with a hamstring injury.

He departed the inter-county scene in 2016.

He thinks that the All Stars "mean very little" but admits his own total affects this thinking. Himself and Paddy Andrews agree on this.

Inter-provincial
McGee represented Ulster in the Inter-Provincial Series.

Post-playing career
In November 2017, he became part of Gary McDaid's backroom team when McDaid became the first manager of the new Donegal under-20 football team.

In March 2021, Donegal announced him as part of Gary Duffy's under-20 management team. In November 2022, he was part of the management team announced for Duffy's successor, Leo McLoone.

Personal life
McGee has a profound fear of flying, a condition which has affected his ability to cope with flights to games.

McGee supports marriage equality and has campaigned to Repeal the 8th Amendment of the Irish Constitution.

Honours
Donegal
 All-Ireland Senior Football Championship: 2012
 Ulster Senior Football Championship: 2011, 2012, 2014
 National Football League Division 1: 2007
 National Football League Division 2: 2011
 Dr McKenna Cup: 2009, 2010

Gaoth Dobhair
 Donegal Senior Football Championship: 2002, 2006, 2018

Colleges 
 Sigerson Cup: 2004, 2005

Individual
 All Star: 0
Nominated in 2012, 2014
 Player of the Week: February 2013

References

External links
 Official profile
 
 Eamon McGee at gaainfo.com
 Eamon McGee reflects on most memorable crisis meeting of his career

1984 births
Living people
Donegal inter-county Gaelic footballers
Gaelic football backs
Gaoth Dobhair Gaelic footballers
Irish expatriate sportspeople in England
Ulster inter-provincial Gaelic footballers
Winners of one All-Ireland medal (Gaelic football)